Cerrah Mehmed Pasha (died January 1604, Istanbul) was an Ottoman statesman. He was grand vizier of the Ottoman Empire from 1598 to 1599.

Mehmed Pasha was the palace surgeon prior to becoming grand vizier, hence his epithet cerrah 'surgeon'. The Istanbul neighborhood of Cerrahpaşa and one of the two medical faculties of Istanbul University,  (the other being ), are named after him.

Family
In 1579 he married Gevherhan Sultan, a daughter of Sultan Selim II and Nurbanu Sultan. He was her second husband. 

They had at least a son:
Sultanzade Salih Bey. Governor of Klis.

See also
 List of Ottoman Grand Viziers

References

Works cited
 

16th-century Grand Viziers of the Ottoman Empire
1604 deaths
Year of birth missing